General Sir Arnold Burrowes Kemball, KCB, KCSI, (18 November 1820, Bombay – 21 September 1908, London), was a British Army officer who took part in the First Afghan War, the Persian War, the Serbian-Ottoman War and the Russo-Turkish War, and was British representative in the Persian Gulf and Consul at Baghdad.

Early life
Kemball was born in Bombay, the son of Vero Shaw Kemball, Bombay Surgeon-General, and was one of five brothers. He was educated at Addiscombe Military Seminary in Surrey, England. In December 1837 he returned to Bombay and joined the Bombay Presidency's Artillery as a second lieutenant.

First Afghan War and Persian War
During the First Afghan War (1839–1842) Kemball served with the Bombay Horse Artillery under Sir John Keane, saw action at the Battle of Ghazni on 23 July 1839, the capture of Kabul that followed, and the defeat of the Afghans at Khelat-i-Ghilzai during the subsequent British retreat to India. From 1842 to 1878 Kemball continued his military career in the Persian Gulf.

He took up military duties in the 1856–1857 Persian War, for which he gained honours and was mentioned in the dispatches of Lieutenant General James Outram. In 1857 the general orders of Lord Canning, Governor-General of India commended Kemball's role in the offensive against Ahwaz, thanking him for his services "afforded on every occasion of difficulty and danger, and especially in the brilliant expedition against Ahwaz". Sir James Outram gave Kemball "unqualified approbation and hearty thanks". Kemball was awarded a Companion of the Order of the Bath (CB) for the Persian campaign and was awarded the KCSI in May 1866.

Diplomatic service

Kemball became Assistant Resident for the British Government at Bushehr in 1842, Resident in 1852, and in February 1851 was promoted to captain.

He was the British political agent for Turkish Arabia in 1847, between 1849 and 1851, and in 1855, and during that time mediated and signed off a Perpetual Treaty of Peace between chiefs of the Arabian Coast.

In 1859 Kemball became acting Consul General at Baghdad. He was promoted to lieutenant-colonel in 1860, and to full colonel in 1863. In 1873 he was appointed official attendant to the Shah of Persia on his visit to England.

Kemball was the British delegate at the 1875–76 British–Turkish–Persian–Russian boundary commission to determine the Turkish–Persian frontier. He later became the commission's president. In 1876 he served as British military commissioner accompanying Abdul-Kerim and his Turkish army in the 1876–77 Serbian–Ottoman War. During the 1876–1877 Constantinople Conference to provide political reform in Ottoman territories, Kemball acted as interpreter between Britain's Secretary of State for India and Ambassador Plenipotentiary to the conference, the Marquess of Salisbury and the Sultan, Abdul Hamid II.

Russo-Turkish War

In the 1877–78 Russo-Turkish War Kemball resumed his role as a British military commissioner with the Turkish Army, advising on, and inspecting, aspects of Turkish battle-readiness. During the 16 June 1877 battle at Zaidakan, Kemble and a Captain Norman were reconnoitering and observing hostilities on horseback. After the battle, they were confronted by a band of Russian Cossacks. Kemble decided to escape the situation, and he and Norman were chased by the Cossacks over twenty-five miles, with contemporary reports stating that a shell had exploded between them, wounding Norman in the arm, and that Kemble could have been shot in the head. They outran the Cossacks, and when at the Aras River swam across it to reach the Turkish camp.

Of Kemble's role in the Russo-Turkish War, The Times correspondent with Abdul-Kerim's army wrote:

At the end of the War Kemble was awarded the KCB, promoted to general, and accompanied Lord Lyons in negotiations at the Berlin Congress.

Civilian life
In 1868 Kemball married Anna Fanny Shaw, daughter of A. N. Shaw (died 25 February 1916). Their only child was Wynford Rose Kemball (died 16 May 1926), who married Bentley Tollemache, 3rd Baron Tollemache in 1902.

Between 1879 and 1886 Kemball became the Commissioner of the Sutherland Estates of the 3rd Duke of Sutherland; the estate was the largest in Britain and included most of the county of Sutherland. During his tenure as commissioner he was involved with a dispute concerning gold digging. In 1869 gold had been found in the Strath of Kildonan resulting in an influx of outside prospectors and the establishment of a company for exploitation; the financial returns were not favourable and digging was abandoned. However, in 1886, following a downturn in the local economy, villagers and crofters petitioned the Duke though Commissioner Kemball for permission to continue searching for gold; permission was not given, and the estate threatened government action if it carried-on. Following further unauthorised digging the estate took steps to stop it. Before the problem was resolved the turmoil surrounding unconstrained and persistent gold digging by locals had caused Kemball to resign as estate commissioner, and Lord Stafford, the local Sutherland parliamentary representative, to resign.

References

Further reading

External links
"Operations in Asia Minor"; Wanganui Herald, p. 2, volume 12, issue 30821, 30 November 1877, National Library of New Zealand. Retrieved 25 June 2012
"Midnight Despatches - London March 20"; The Montreal Gazette, 21 March 1878, National Library of New Zealand. Retrieved 25 June 2012
"The Daily Witness"; Montreal Daily Witness, 4 September 1877, National Library of New Zealand. Retrieved 25 June 2012
"English News"; Colonist, p. 3, volume 19, issue 2152, 11 November 1876, National Library of New Zealand. Retrieved 25 June 2012
"Raising the Siege of Kars"; The Sydney Morning Herald, 12 September 1877. Retrieved 25 June 2012
"Alleged Cruelties by Turks in Asia"; Wanganui Chronicle, p. 2, volume 20, issue 3548, 18 December 1877, National Library of New Zealand. Retrieved 25 June 2012

1820 births
1908 deaths
Graduates of Addiscombe Military Seminary
Bombay Artillery officers
British diplomats
British Army generals
Knights Commander of the Order of the Bath
Knights Commander of the Order of the Star of India
British military personnel of the First Anglo-Afghan War
British military personnel of the Anglo-Persian War